Statistics of Czechoslovak First League in the 1948 season.

Overview
It was contested by 14 teams, and SK Slavia Prague led the league after 13 matches. However the season was interrupted due to league reorganisation and no championship was awarded. Josef Bican was the league's top scorer with 21 goals.

Stadia and locations

League standings

Results

Top goalscorers

References

Czechoslovakia - List of final tables (RSSSF)

Czechoslovak First League seasons
Czech
1948–49 in Czechoslovak football